An organic field-effect transistor (OFET) is a field-effect transistor using an organic semiconductor in its channel. OFETs can be prepared either by vacuum evaporation of small molecules, by solution-casting of polymers or small molecules, or by mechanical transfer of a peeled single-crystalline organic layer onto a substrate. These devices have been developed to realize low-cost, large-area electronic products and biodegradable electronics. OFETs have been fabricated with various device geometries. The most commonly used device geometry is bottom gate with top drain and source electrodes, because this geometry is similar to the thin-film silicon transistor (TFT) using thermally grown SiO2 as gate dielectric. Organic polymers, such as poly(methyl-methacrylate) (PMMA), can also be used as dielectric. One of the benefits of OFETs, especially compared with inorganic TFTs, is their unprecedented physical flexibility, which leads to biocompatible applications, for instance in the future health care industry of personalized biomedicines and bioelectronics.

In May 2007, Sony reported the first full-color, video-rate, flexible, all plastic display, in which both the thin-film transistors and the light-emitting pixels were made of organic materials.

History of OFETs

The concept of a field-effect transistor (FET) was first proposed by Julius Edgar Lilienfeld, who received a patent for his idea in 1930. He proposed that a field-effect transistor behaves as a capacitor with a conducting channel between a source and a drain electrode. Applied voltage on the gate electrode controls the amount of charge carriers flowing through the system.
 
The first insulated-gate field-effect transistor was designed and prepared by Mohamed Atalla and Dawon Kahng at Bell Labs using a metal–oxide–semiconductor: the MOSFET (metal–oxide–semiconductor field-effect transistor). It was invented in 1959, and presented in 1960. Also known as the MOS transistor, the MOSFET is the most widely manufactured device in the world. The concept of a thin-film transistor (TFT) was first proposed by John Wallmark who in 1957 filed a patent for a thin film MOSFET in which germanium monoxide was used as a gate dielectric. Thin-film transistor was developed in 1962 by Paul K. Weimer who implemented Wallmark's ideas. The TFT is a special type of MOSFET.

Rising costs of materials and manufacturing, as well as public interest in more environmentally friendly electronics materials, have supported development of organic based electronics in more recent years. In 1986, Mitsubishi Electric researchers H. Koezuka, A. Tsumura and Tsuneya Ando reported the first organic field-effect transistor, based on a polymer of thiophene molecules. The thiophene polymer is a type of conjugated polymer that is able to conduct charge, eliminating the need to use expensive metal oxide semiconductors. Additionally, other conjugated polymers have been shown to have semiconducting properties. OFET design has also improved in the past few decades. Many OFETs are now designed based on the thin-film transistor (TFT) model, which allows the devices to use less conductive materials in their design. Improvement on these models in the past few years have been made to field-effect mobility and on–off current ratios.

Materials
One common feature of OFET materials is the inclusion of an aromatic or otherwise conjugated π-electron system, facilitating the delocalization of orbital wavefunctions. Electron withdrawing groups or donating groups can be attached that facilitate hole or electron transport.

OFETs employing many aromatic and conjugated materials as the active semiconducting layer have been reported, including small molecules such as rubrene, tetracene, pentacene, diindenoperylene, perylenediimides, tetracyanoquinodimethane (TCNQ), and polymers such as polythiophenes (especially poly(3-hexylthiophene) (P3HT)), polyfluorene, polydiacetylene, poly(2,5-thienylene vinylene), poly(p-phenylene vinylene) (PPV).

The field is very active, with newly synthesized and tested compounds reported weekly in prominent research journals. Many review articles exist documenting the development of these materials.

Rubrene-based OFETs show the highest carrier mobility 20–40 cm2/(V·s). Another popular OFET material is pentacene, which has been used since the 1980s, but with mobilities 10 to 100 times lower (depending on the substrate) than rubrene. The major problem with pentacene, as well as many other organic conductors, is its rapid oxidation in air to form pentacene-quinone. However if the pentacene is preoxidized, and the thus formed pentacene-quinone is used as the gate insulator, then the mobility can approach the rubrene values. This pentacene oxidation technique is akin to the silicon oxidation used in the silicon electronics.

Polycrystalline tetrathiafulvalene and its analogues result in mobilities in the range 0.1–1.4 cm2/(V·s). However, the mobility exceeds 10 cm2/(V·s) in solution-grown or vapor-transport-grown single crystalline hexamethylene-tetrathiafulvalene (HMTTF). The ON/OFF voltage is different for devices grown by those two techniques, presumably due to the higher processing temperatures using in the vapor transport grows.

All the above-mentioned devices are based on p-type conductivity. N-type OFETs are yet poorly developed. They are usually based on perylenediimides or fullerenes or their derivatives, and show electron mobilities below 2 cm2/(V·s).

Device design of organic field-effect transistors
Three essential components of field-effect transistors are the source, the drain and the gate. Field-effect transistors usually operate as a capacitor. They are composed of two plates. One plate works as a conducting channel between two ohmic contacts, which are called the source and the drain contacts. The other plate works to control the charge induced into the channel, and it is called the gate. The direction of the movement of the carriers in the channel is from the source to the drain. Hence the relationship between these three components is that the gate controls the carrier movement from the source to the drain.

When this capacitor concept is applied to the device design, various devices can be built up based on the difference in the controller – i.e. the gate. This can be the gate material, the location of the gate with respect to the channel, how the gate is isolated from the channel, and what type of carrier is induced by the gate voltage into channel (such as electrons in an n-channel device, holes in a p-channel device, and both electrons and holes in a double injection device).

  
Classified by the properties of the carrier, three types of FETs are shown schematically in Figure 1. They are MOSFET (metal–oxide–semiconductor field-effect transistor), MESFET (metal–semiconductor field-effect transistor) and TFT (thin-film transistor).

MOSFET
The most prominent and widely used FET in modern microelectronics is the MOSFET (metal–oxide–semiconductor FET). There are different kinds in this category, such as MISFET (metal–insulator–semiconductor field-effect transistor), and IGFET (insulated-gate FET). A schematic of a MISFET is shown in Figure 1a. The source and the drain are connected by a semiconductor and the gate is separated from the channel by a layer of insulator. If there is no bias (potential difference) applied on the gate, the Band bending is induced due to the energy difference of metal conducting band and the semiconductor Fermi level. Therefore, a higher concentration of holes is formed on the interface of the semiconductor and the insulator. When an enough positive bias is applied on the gate contact, the bended band becomes flat. If a larger positive bias is applied, the band bending in the opposite direction occurs and the region close to the insulator-semiconductor interface becomes depleted of holes. Then the depleted region is formed. At an even larger positive bias, the band bending becomes so large that the Fermi level at the interface of the semiconductor and the insulator becomes closer to the bottom of the conduction band than to the top of the valence band, therefore, it forms an inversion layer of electrons, providing the conducting channel. Finally, it turns the device on.

MESFET

The second type of device is described in Fig.1b. The only difference of this one from the MISFET is that the n-type source and drain are connected by an n-type region. In this case, the depletion region extends all over the n-type channel at zero gate voltage in a normally “off” device (it is similar to the larger positive bias in MISFET case). In the normally “on” device, a portion of the channel is not depleted, and thus leads to passage of a current at zero gate voltage.

TFT

A thin-film transistor (TFT) is illustrated in Figure 1c. Here the source and drain electrodes are directly deposited onto the conducting channel (a thin layer of semiconductor) then a thin film of insulator is deposited between the semiconductor and the metal gate contact. This structure suggests that there is no depletion region to separate the device from the substrate. If there is zero bias, the electrons are expelled from the surface due to the Fermi-level energy difference of the semiconductor and the metal. This leads to band bending of semiconductor. In this case, there is no carrier movement between the source and drain. When the positive charge is applied, the accumulation of electrons on the interface leads to the bending of the semiconductor in an opposite way and leads to the lowering of the conduction band with regards to the Fermi-level of the semiconductor. Then a highly conductive channel forms at the interface (shown in Figure 2).

OFET

OFETs adopt the architecture of TFT. With the development of the conducting polymer, the semiconducting properties of small conjugated molecules have been recognized. The interest in OFETs has grown enormously in the past ten years. The reasons for this surge of interest are manifold. The performance of OFETs, which can compete with that of amorphous silicon (a-Si) TFTs with field-effect mobilities of 0.5–1 cm2 V−1 s−1 and ON/OFF current ratios (which indicate the ability of the device to shut down) of 106–108, has improved significantly. Currently, thin-film OFET mobility values of 5 cm2 V−1 s−1 in the case of vacuum-deposited small molecules 
and 0.6 cm2 V−1 s−1 for solution-processed polymers have been reported. As a result, there is now a greater industrial interest in using OFETs for applications that are currently incompatible with the use of a-Si or other inorganic transistor technologies. One of their main technological attractions is that all the layers of an OFET can be deposited and patterned at room temperature by a combination of low-cost solution-processing and direct-write printing, which makes them ideally suited for realization of low-cost, large-area electronic functions on flexible substrates.

Device preparation

Thermally oxidized silicon is a traditional substrate for OFETs where the silicon dioxide serves as the gate insulator. The active FET layer is usually deposited onto this substrate using either (i) thermal evaporation, (ii) coating from organic solution, or (iii) electrostatic lamination. The first two techniques result in polycrystalline active layers; they are much easier to produce, but result in relatively poor transistor performance. Numerous variations of the solution coating technique (ii) are known, including dip-coating, spin-coating, inkjet printing and screen printing. The electrostatic lamination technique is based on manual peeling of a thin layer off a single organic crystal; it results in a superior single-crystalline active layer, yet it is more tedious. The thickness of the gate oxide and the active layer is below one micrometer.

Carrier transport

The carrier transport in OFET is specific for two-dimensional (2D) carrier propagation through the device. Various experimental techniques were used for this study, such as Haynes - Shockley experiment on the transit times of injected carriers, time-of-flight (TOF) experiment for the determination of carrier mobility, pressure-wave propagation experiment for probing electric-field distribution in insulators, organic monolayer experiment for probing orientational dipolar changes, optical time-resolved second harmonic generation (TRM-SHG), etc. Whereas carriers propagate through polycrystalline OFETs in a diffusion-like (trap-limited) manner, they move through the conduction band in the best single-crystalline OFETs.

The most important parameter of OFET carrier transport is carrier mobility. Its evolution over the years of OFET research is shown in the graph for polycrystalline and single crystalline OFETs. The horizontal lines indicate the comparison guides to the main OFET competitors – amorphous (a-Si) and polycrystalline silicon. The graph reveals that the mobility in polycrystalline OFETs is comparable to that of a-Si whereas mobility in rubrene-based OFETs (20–40 cm2/(V·s)) approaches that of best poly-silicon devices.

Development of accurate models of charge carrier mobility in OFETs is an active field of research. Fishchuk et al. have developed an analytical model of carrier mobility in OFETs that accounts for carrier density and the polaron effect. 

While average carrier density is typically calculated as function of gate voltage when used as an input for carrier mobility models, modulated amplitude reflectance spectroscopy (MARS) has been shown to provide a spatial map of carrier density across an OFET channel.

Light-emitting OFETs
Because an electric current flows through such a transistor, it can be used as a light-emitting device, thus integrating current modulation and light emission. In 2003, a German group reported the first organic light-emitting field-effect transistor (OLET). The device structure comprises interdigitated gold source- and drain electrodes and a polycrystalline tetracene thin film. Both, positive charges (holes) as well as negative charges (electrons) are injected from the gold contacts into this layer leading to electroluminescence from the tetracene.

See also
 Organic electronics
 OLED
 Charge modulation spectroscopy
Thin film transistor
Oxide thin film transistor

References

Molecular electronics
Organic electronics
Flexible displays